NUE or Nue may refer to:

 Nuremberg Airport's IATA code
 Nucor, an American steel making company's NYSE stock symbol
 New Urban Entertainment Television, a defunct American cable network targeting African-Americans
 Nue, a Japanese legendary creature
 Nue (album), a 2001 album by Lara Fabian
 Nitrogen use efficiency, the ratio between the amount of nitrogen taken up by a crop and the amount present in the soil